Jennifer S. Powers is an American ecologist and full professor in the Departments of Ecology, Evolution and Behavior, and Plant and Microbial Biology at the University of Minnesota. Powers' research has advanced the understanding of global change consequences, ecosystem ecology, restoration and conservation of tropical dry forests. She also has been very active on several editorial boards, and in 2019 became the editor-in-chief of Biotropica, a scientific journal from the Association of Tropical Biology and Conservation (ATBC).

Education 

Powers received her B.A. in Biology from Reed College, Oregon in 1991. In 1995 she completed her M.Sc. in the Department of Forest Science at Oregon State University. She received her Ph.D. in Biology from the Department of Biology at Duke University in 2001, working with William H. Schlesinger.

Career 
After completing her PhD, Powers did postdoctoral work at Stony Brook University and at the University of Minnesota. She has been working in tropical forest, with special interest in tropical dry forests, in Central and South America for over 20 years. Jennifer is also part of the 2ndFOR research network on secondary forests, a founder of investigadores ACG (iACG), a volunteer organization that promotes research in the Área de Conservación Guanacaste (ACG) in Costa Rica, a research associate at the Smithsonian Tropical Research Institute (STRI) Smithsonian Tropical Research Institute in Panama and an officer of ATBC.

Awards and honors 
 2009–2011. McKnight Land Grant Professor, University of Minnesota
2009–2012. Institute on the Environment Resident Fellow
 2020. Ecological Society of America Fellow

References

External links 
 The Powers Lab
 Night and Day in The Rainforest
 "Editor Profiles: Professor Jennifer S Powers, Editor-in-Chief", Biotropica. Retrieved May 10, 2021.
 

Date of birth missing (living people)
American ecologists
Women ecologists
Duke University School of Medicine alumni
Oregon State University alumni
University of Minnesota faculty
Reed College alumni
Stony Brook University alumni
Year of birth missing (living people)
Living people